The Australian cricket team toured Bangladesh between 7 April to 13 April 2011. The tour consisted of three One Day Internationals (ODIs). Michael Clarke was named as the Australian captain, following Ricky Ponting's resignation.

Squads

Tour match

Bangladesh Cricket Board XI vs Australians

ODI series

1st ODI

2nd ODI

3rd ODI

References

External links
 Series home at ESPN Cricinfo

2011 in Australian cricket
Bangladesh
2011 in Bangladeshi cricket
2011
International cricket competitions in 2011